Henry de Beaumont (before 1280 – 10 March 1340), jure uxoris 4th Earl of Buchan and suo jure 1st Baron Beaumont, was a key figure in the Anglo-Scots wars of the thirteenth and fourteenth centuries, known as the Wars of Scottish Independence.

Henry de Beaumont was a veteran campaigner who participated in every major engagement, from the Battle of Falkirk in 1298 to the Battle of Halidon Hill in 1333. Although not now a widely known figure, he was, nevertheless, of considerable military and political importance. His long experience in the Scottish wars led him to develop a battle technique later used to great effect at Crécy and Agincourt. 

As one of a group of Anglo-Scots nobles later known as the 'disinherited' — Englishmen whose Scottish lands had been forfeited – he was to do much to overturn the peace between England and Scotland established by the Treaty of Northampton and bring about a Second War of Scottish Independence. 

By his marriage, shortly before 14 July 1310, to Alice Comyn, Countess of Buchan (died 3 July 1349), the niece and heir of John Comyn, Earl of Buchan, he was recognised as Earl in right of his wife.

Life
Henry de Beaumont was the eldest son of Louis of Brienne (d. after 1 September 1297) and Agnès de Beaumont, Viscount of Beaumont in Maine, France and Seigneur of Beaumont-le-Vicomte (later Beaumont-sur-Sarthe), Sainte-Suzanne, La Fleche, Fresnay-le-Vicomte, Le Lude.

First campaigns
He first took up military service with Edward I while he was campaigning in Flanders in 1297 against Philip IV of France. When Edward returned to England the following year to deal with the after-effects of the defeat of his northern army by the Scots at the Battle of Stirling Bridge, he was accompanied by Beaumont. In the ensuing Battle of Falkirk, Beaumont was one of the young knights who had his horse killed from under him by the spears of William Wallace's schiltrons. Beaumont again attended Edward I in the Scottish wars in 1302.

Landed estates
Beaumont obtained large grants of manors and lands, including Folkingham, Barton-upon-Humber, and Heckington, Lincolnshire, from King Edward II. He was summoned to parliament from 4 March 1309 to 20 October 1332, by Writs directed to Henrico de Bellomonte, whereby he is held to have become Lord Beaumont. He was again summoned to the English parliament from 22 January 1334 through to 16 November 1339, as Earl of Buchan. He sat in the Scottish parliament of Edward Balliol on 10 February 1334, as Earl of Buchan.

He had a grant of the Lordship of the Isle of Man in 1310. The next year he and his sister, Isabel de Vesci, were banished from Court by the Ordainers as associates of Piers Gaveston, but soon returned. In 1313 he and his sister acquired the reversion of the manors of Seacourt, Berkshire, and Tackley, Oxfordshire, which, upon her death without issue in 1334, fell to him. In 1312 he received Birthorpe, Lincolnshire, forfeited by Roger de Birthorpe following an attack on nearby Sempringham Priory. Between 1317 and 1321 his wife succeeded to the English estates of her sister, Margery Comyn, wife successively of Sir John Ross and Sir William de Lindsay. He purchased the Lordship of Ditchburn, Northumberland, in 1320.

Bannockburn
On the first day of the battle Henry was in one of the two cavalry forces alongside Robert Clifford and Sir Thomas de Grey of Heaton, father of the chronicler Thomas Grey whose account of events follows;

On the second day, Beaumont was amongst those who accompanied Edward II in his flight from the field and was subsequently deprived of his Scottish Earldom of Buchan by King Robert.

"The Disinherited"
In the November after Bannockburn, Beaumont was one of those affected by the sentence of forfeiture passed by the Scottish parliament against all those with land and title in Scotland who continued to fight with the English. Thus was created that class of nobility known as the disinherited. Although this also included men of greater standing like David III Strathbogie, titular Earl of Atholl, Beaumont was to prove by far the most determined in the pursuit of his lost honours.

He fought on the side of Edward II at the Battle of Boroughbridge in 1322. However, when Edward II entered into truce negotiations with the Scots in May 1323, Beaumont, hitherto a close associate of the king, argued against any agreement which disregarded the claims of the disinherited, for whom he had become the leading spokesman. Edward overruled Beaumont and the two quarrelled. Beaumont was briefly imprisoned for contempt and disobedience at the Privy Council (of which he was a member), after which he retired from Court to continue his intrigues in exile, eventually joining forces with Edward's estranged wife, Queen Isabella, and her lover Roger Mortimer, 1st Earl of March. His cause, however, was not furthered by the coup of 1327, in which Isabella and Mortimer deposed the king and replaced him with his under-age son, Edward III.

Anxious to break the deadlock in the north Isabella and Mortimer persuaded Parliament to accept the terms of the Treaty of Northampton, which ignored, once again, the claims of the disinherited. Many of the senior nobility repudiated what they considered to be a shameful peace; and when Henry, 3rd Earl of Lancaster rose in revolt in late 1328 he was joined by Henry Beaumont, Thomas Wake, Henry Ferrers, Thomas Rosselin and David de Strathbogie, the latter now married to Beaumont's daughter, Katherine. This was the nucleus of the party soon to be prominent supporters of Edward Balliol, the son of the former King John Balliol. The rising was short-lived; and when Lancaster submitted in January 1329, Wake and Strathbogie also made their peace.  Not so Henry Beaumont, who was specifically excluded from pardon, going into exile to plot Mortimer's downfall.

When the powerful Edmund of Woodstock, 1st Earl of Kent was arrested in March 1330 and charged with conspiring to restore Edward II, whom he had been deluded into believing was still alive, he alleged at his trial that Beaumont had met him in Paris and told him that his plot would be supported from Scotland by the armed intervention of Donald Earl of Mar, a personal friend of the ex-king. Kent was executed and Beaumont would never be allowed to return to England while Mortimer and Isabella held on to power.

Edward de Balliol

The peace of Northampton seemed to end forever the hopes of the disinherited. Two things changed this: the death of King Robert Bruce in 1329, followed in 1330 by a palace coup in England, which saw the overthrow and execution of Roger Mortimer and the assumption of full powers by King Edward III. 

In Scotland, Robert's infant son, David II was king, bringing the inevitable tensions that follow from a royal minority. Edward, for the time being at least, maintained the peace with Scotland, but he was known to share the views of many of his countrymen that Northampton was a turpis pax - a shameful peace. In 1330, Edward III would make a formal request to the Scottish Crown to restore the lands of Beaumont's earldom to him, which was refused.

From near extinction, the cause of the disinherited was now revived; but it needed direction and focus. Above all, it needed a cause, something greater than frustrated ambition. By the early 1330s, the cause had become Edward Balliol, in the judgement of some the rightful King of Scotland.

Edward Balliol is clearly an important figure, but it is difficult to decide if he was the author of his own ambitions or a lever for the designs of others. He took no part in the first war, and it is doubtful if he had any military experience before he came to Scotland in 1332. 

The driving force, as always, was Henry Beaumont, the lead conspirator of the disinherited. It was he who formed the 'party' of the disinherited in the period after the peace of Northampton: he who encouraged Balliol, with Edward III's approval, to leave his French estates and come to England. He was a seasoned campaigner, who had been present both at Bannockburn and the Battle of Boroughbridge, and learned much from both encounters. 

It is almost certain that he was the architect of Balliol's victory at the Battle of Dupplin Moor where he fought; and he is likely to have advised Edward on the tactics that brought him the first great military success of his career at the Battle of Halidon Hill, the exact foretaste of the later triumph at Crécy. Beaumont, moreover, provided much of the financial support that allowed the impecunious Balliol to descend on Scotland at the head of an army of freebooters. But his principal loyalty was to himself and then to Edward III; for, as time would show, Edward Balliol was a hook on which he hung the cloak of his ambitions.

War by other means
In assuming power Edward would have been mindful of the support he had received from Beaumont. He would also have been aware that while the restless earl was a useful friend he was also a dangerous enemy. Beaumont's shifting loyalties since 1323 had all been dictated by his overriding desire to recover the earldom of Buchan. But Edward embraced the cause of the disinherited for reasons more subtle than simple gratitude: for Beaumont's tireless plotting eventually provided the occasion to set aside the peace of 1328.

Before the end of 1330 Edward started to make strong diplomatic representations on behalf of Beaumont and Thomas Wake, the claimant to the Lordship of Liddesdale, the only two noblemen to be officially recognised as disinherited by the English and Scottish governments. He wrote to the young King David II in December, requesting restoration of the lands of the 'Earl of Buchan' and the 'Lord of Liddesdale'. But Edward must have realised that there was little chance of the Scots accepting Beaumont and Wake in their midst. It would make little sense to hand over important lands in the west march and the northeast of Scotland to men whose personal and political loyalties lay with a potential enemy, and who were widely known to be vehement opponents of the Treaty of Northampton. David's guardian Thomas Randolph, Earl of Moray, was obviously conscious of this, and Edward's request was effectively ignored. Beaumont now began to seek restitution by other means.

Sometime between 1330 and 1331 Beaumont conceived a plan to invade Scotland at the head of a private army, headed by himself and Edward Balliol. The first contact between Balliol and Beaumont had been in 1330. In 1331 these approaches became more serious. In June both he and Strathbogie crossed the Channel to visit the exile in Picardy. Beaumont returned in August and again in November when he was accompanied by Walter Comyn. The Brut Chronicle contains a colourful story, not repeated in any other source, that Balliol had incurred the displeasure of the King of France, and had to be rescued from imprisonment by Beaumont's special pleadings. What is certain is that he was finally persuaded to leave France and come to England in the winter of 1331. He was settled in the manor of Standal in Yorkshire, a property belonging to Beaumont's sister, the Lady Vesci. Beaumont then visited King Edward and obtained an important concession: he would not allow the disinherited to cross the border in open breach of the Treaty of Northampton, but he would not stop them sailing from English ports. By the summer of 1332, all was ready and a small army of archers and men-at-arms sailed from various ports in Yorkshire, landing on the coast of Fife in August.

Invasion of Edward Balliol
Soon after landing the army, under the skilful command of Beaumont, confronted and defeated a much larger Scottish force at the Battle of Dupplin Moor in August 1332, using an effective, and murderous, combination of infantry and archers. Building on this victory, the army advanced on Scone, where Edward Balliol was crowned King of Scots on 24 September. The coronation was a tense and unhappy occasion, for the new king and his small army were isolated in a sullen and hostile country. At the banquet, after the coronation ceremony, it is said that the guests remained fully armed, save for their helmets.  There was good reason for this; for it is also said that the local people attached themselves to Balliol more from fear than love. The terror of the new regime soon spread, and the priors of St. Andrews wrote of the lordship of Edward Balliol and Henry Beaumont, and their inability to collect the dues from their church at Fordun 'for fear of the said Lord Henry.'

It was clear that, in the absence of widespread native support, the adventure could only prosper with the open support of King Edward. As bait Balliol wrote to him offering to cede all of south-east Scotland to England. This proposal was carried south by Henry Beaumont and David de Strathbogie, who came to attend the meeting of Parliament at York. Before they could return, Balliol and what was left of his army were surprised by a party of Bruce loyalists at Annan and chased out of the country. All of the expense and effort of the past years had come to nothing.

Invasion of Edward III
In January 1333 Edward finally dropped the pretence of neutrality: Edward Balliol was formally recognised as King of Scotland and promised military aid. Subsidies were now paid to Beaumont and the others, to help prepare for a fresh invasion. In July a fresh Scots army was cut to pieces at Halidon Hill, just outside Berwick-upon-Tweed, using the same battle tactics as Dupplin Moor. Once again the disinherited advanced into Scotland. Henry Beaumont was able to return to Buchan where, according to Andrew Wyntoun, he repaired the old Comyn stronghold of Dundarg on the Aberdeenshire coast in 1333/4, which had been destroyed by Robert Bruce in 1308:

The Beaumont went intil Buchan;
And there, Dundarg of lime and stane
He made stoutly, and therin lay.

Even so, the hold of the disinherited lords was no more certain than before. By September 1334 Edward Balliol, faced with a full-scale revolt, sent urgent appeals to England for yet more assistance.  To make matters even worse his followers, who had been brought together by greed for land, were driven apart by the very same greed. In a dispute over the estates of Alexander de Mowbray, killed at Annan in 1332, Balliol was unwise enough to quarrel with Beaumont who, in the fashion of Achilles, withdrew from Court in a fit of pique, to Dundarg.

Balliol's regime collapsed, and for the second time in his career, he fled across the border. Beaumont, in the meantime, was besieged in Dundarg by Sir Andrew de Moray of Avoch and Bothwell, the new Guardian of Scotland. Under continual attack, and running short of supplies, he was compelled to surrender on 23 December 1334. After a brief imprisonment, he was ransomed and returned to England in time for the summer campaign of 1335. When he came back to Scotland it is uncertain if he ever saw Buchan again.  Dundarg was destroyed for the second and last time in its history.

Later years
Beaumont was an active participant in Edward's invasion of Scotland in 1335, the largest he ever mounted on behalf of his hapless protege; but the results were no more lasting than before. In November the uncertain gains of the summer were wiped out by Moray's victory over Strathbogie at the Battle of Culblean.

After Culblean, Balliol's shadowy kingdom virtually disappeared. Perth was retaken. Only Cupar Castle in Fife and remote Lochindorb kept his cause alive. In Lochindorb the widow of Strathbogie, Kathrine Beaumont, daughter of Henry Beaumont, had been under siege by Moray since late 1335. The rescue of Kathrine Beaumont was to allow Edward III to drape a cloak of high chivalry over one of his most destructive military adventures. English action took the form of a large-scale punitive raid, intended to knock out Scots resistance and, at the same time, forestall a possible French landing in the northeast.  Edward initially gave command to Henry of Lancaster, Beaumont's son-in-law; although he eventually decided to take charge in person. Edward advanced into Aberdeenshire in the summer of 1336. Beaumont came with him, as did Edward Balliol. Kathrine was duly rescued, while the northeast was subject to widespread destruction.

It was in this season that Henry Beaumont embarked on his last actions in Scotland, by seeking vengeance against those whom he held responsible for the death of his son-in-law. The Pluscarden Chronicle describes his actions thus: Henry Beaumont, to avenge his son-in-law, the Earl of Atholl, who was slain at Culblean, either cast into prison or put to cruel death all who had taken part in the engagement in which he was slain; whereby much innocent blood was shed.

In 1337 Edward III, in beginning the opening rounds of what was to become the Hundred Years War, virtually lost all interest in the future well-being of Balliol and his hopeless cause.  Even Henry Beaumont, the most determined of the disinherited, had had enough.  Rather than return to Scotland with Balliol, the old warrior accompanied King Edward to the Low Countries, from whence he had come with his royal grandfather in 1298, where he died in March 1340, his long struggle incomplete.  His son, John, never claimed the lost earldom of Buchan. When Beaumont's wife, Alice, died in 1349 the Comyn line of Buchan, which stretched back to the early thirteenth century, finally came to an end.

By the time an Inquisition was held to assess his lands in April 1340, Henry was holding a large amount of land in Lincolnshire as well as smaller areas in Leicestershire, Northumberland and Yorkshire.

Marriage and children

Shortly before 14 July 1310 Henry married Alice Comyn, Countess of Buchan, the niece and heiress of John Comyn, Earl of Buchan. He was recognised as Earl of Buchan jure uxoris. By Alice he had children including: 
 Elizabeth Beaumont (c. 1320 – 1400) who married Nicholas Audley, 3rd Baron Audley (1328–1391), without children.
 John de Beaumont, 2nd Lord Beaumont (c. 1318), who married Eleanor of Lancaster, great-granddaughter of King Henry III and a sister of Henry of Grosmont.
 Isabel de Beaumont, married Henry of Grosmont, 1st Duke of Lancaster, brother of Eleanor of Lancaster. They were ancestors of the English Royal House of Lancaster, with King Henry IV of England being the couple's grandson.
 Katherine de Beaumont, married David III Strathbogie, titular Earl of Atholl, 1st Lord Strathbogie
Joan de Beaumont, who ("it is said") married Fulk VII FitzWarin, 3rd Baron FitzWarin (died 1349), of Whittington Castle in Shropshire and Alveston in Gloucestershire.

References

Further reading
 Balfour-Melville, E. W. M., Edward III and David II, 1954.
 Brut, or the Chronicles of England, ed. F. W. D. Brie, 1906.
 Brown, C. "The Second Scottish War of Independence", 2001.
 Pluscarden, the Book of, ed. F. J. H. Skene 1880.
 Campbell, T., England, Scotland and the Hundred Years War, in Europe in the late Middle Ages, ed. R. Highfield et al., 1970.
 

 Nicolson, R., Edward III and the Scots, 1965.
 
 Ramsay, J. H., The Genesis of Lancaster,1307-99, 1913.
 Ridpath, G., The Border History of England and Scotland, 1810.
 Richardson, Douglas, Plantagenet Ancestry, Baltimore, Md., 2004,p. 83-4, 
 Webster, B., Scotland Without a King, 1329-1341, in Medieval Scotland: Crown, Lordship and Community, ed. A. Grant and K' J. Stringer, 1993.
 Wyntoun, Andrew, The Original Chronicle of Scotland, ed. N. Denholm Young, 1957.

Buchan
14th-century Scottish earls
Buchan
People of the Wars of Scottish Independence
House of Brienne
Barons Beaumont
English people of French descent
Year of birth uncertain
Year of birth unknown
1340 deaths